Felice Berardo (6 July 1888 – 12 December 1956) was an Italian footballer who played as a striker. He made his debut for the Italy national football team on 6 January 1911 in a game against Hungary. He also represented Italy at the 1912 Summer Olympics.

Honours

Player
Pro Vercelli
Italian Football Championship: 1911–12, 1912–13
Genoa
Italian Football Championship: 1914–15

References

External links
 

1888 births
1956 deaths
Italian footballers
F.C. Pro Vercelli 1892 players
Genoa C.F.C. players
Torino F.C. players
Italy international footballers
Olympic footballers of Italy
Footballers at the 1912 Summer Olympics
Association football forwards